Umeschandra College is an undergraduate college in Kolkata, India that offers courses in commerce. It is affiliated with the University of Calcutta. It was named after Brahmo thinker Umesh Chandra Dutta.

Notable alumni
Mir Afsar Ali, comedian and television personality
Laxmi Ratan Shukla -Cricketer

See also 
List of colleges affiliated to the University of Calcutta
Education in India
Education in West Bengal

References

External links

Universities and colleges in Kolkata
Universities and colleges affiliated with the Brahmo Samaj
University of Calcutta affiliates
Educational institutions established in 1961
Commerce colleges in India
1961 establishments in West Bengal